In 2003 Acer Inc. signed a sponsorship agreement with Scuderia Ferrari. In 2006 the company formerly Official Supplier became Official Sponsor to Scuderia Ferrari. This sponsorship has led to the creation of Ferrari branded product series: notebooks, netbooks and a smartphone.

Acer Ferrari series

Acer Ferrari 3000
Acer Ferrari 3200
Acer Ferrari 3400
Acer Ferrari 4000
Acer Ferrari 4005LMi
Acer Ferrari 4006LMi
Acer Ferrari 5000
Acer Ferrari 5005LMi
Acer Ferrari 1000
Acer Ferrari 1100
Acer Ferrari 1200
Acer Ferrari One
Acer Liquid E Ferrari
Acer Liquid Mini Ferrari
Acer Ferrari LCD Monitor Series (F-17, F-19, F-20)

Acer Ferrari One 
Acer Ferrari One (also known as the Acer FO200) is an ultraportable design with an 11.6" display, a dual-core AMD Athlon processor and Dolby Home Theater audio.

Acer Liquid E Ferrari 
In June 2010 Acer Inc. launched a special edition Ferrari smartphone. Acer Liquid E Ferrari has a 3.5 inch touchscreen and runs Android operating system.

External links
Acer Ferrari Web Site (Broken link)
Acer Liquid E Ferrari Site (Broken link)
Acer Liquid E Ferrari Video

References

Acer Inc. laptops
Acer Inc. products